Trenton Municipal Airport  is a city-owned, public-use airport located one mile (2 km) east of the central business district of Trenton, a city in Grundy County, Missouri, United States.

Facilities and aircraft 
For the 12-month period ending August 22, 2007, the airport had 2,710 aircraft operations, an average of 7 per day: 96% general aviation, 4% air taxi, <1% military.

References

External links 
 

Airports in Missouri
Buildings and structures in Grundy County, Missouri